Hipposcarus longiceps or Pacific longnose parrotfish is a species of marine ray-finned fish, a parrotfish in the family Scaridae. It is found in the eastern Indian Oceans and the western Pacific Ocean from the Cocos-Keeling Islands and Rowley Shoals in the eastern Indian Ocean to the Line and Tuamotu islands in the east, north to the Ryukyu Islands, south to the Great Barrier Reef and New Caledonia.

Hipposcarus longiceps was first formally described as Scarus longiceps in 1840 by the French ichthyologist Achille Valenciennes (1794–1865) with the type locality given as Waigeo in modern Indonesia.

The species is on the IUCN Red List as Least Concern, from the assessment year 2012.

References

External links
 

longiceps
Taxa named by Achille Valenciennes
Fish described in 1840